Seducing Down the Door: A Collection 1970−1990 is the second compilation album by Welsh musician John Cale, released by Rhino Records in July 1994. It featured songs from Cale's albums released between 1970 and 1990 (including songs from collaborative albums with Brian Eno and Lou Reed). It includes the songs "Jack the Ripper", an unreleased single from 1978, and "Temper", an outtake from The Academy in Peril album that originally appeared on a 1980 Warner Bros. sampler album, Troublemakers.

Track listing

References

John Cale compilation albums
1994 compilation albums
Albums produced by John Cale
Albums produced by Chris Thomas (record producer)
Albums produced by Mike Thorne
Albums produced by Brian Eno
Albums produced by Lewis Merenstein
Rhino Records compilation albums